The Canton of Auxi-le-Château is a canton situated in the department of the Pas-de-Calais and in the Hauts-de-France region of northern France.

Composition
At the French canton reorganisation which came into effect in March 2015, the canton was expanded from 26 to 84 communes:

Aix-en-Issart
Aubin-Saint-Vaast
Auchy-lès-Hesdin
Auxi-le-Château
Azincourt
Béalencourt
Beaurainville
Beauvoir-Wavans
Blangy-sur-Ternoise
Blingel
Boffles
Boisjean
Boubers-lès-Hesmond
Bouin-Plumoison
Brévillers
Brimeux
Buire-au-Bois
Buire-le-Sec
Campagne-lès-Hesdin
Capelle-lès-Hesdin
Caumont
Cavron-Saint-Martin
Chériennes
Contes
Douriez
Éclimeux
Fillièvres
Fontaine-l'Étalon
Fresnoy
Galametz
Gennes-Ivergny
Gouy-Saint-André
Grigny
Guigny
Guisy
Haravesnes
Hesdin
Hesmond
Huby-Saint-Leu
Incourt
Labroye
Lespinoy
La Loge
Loison-sur-Créquoise
Maintenay
Maisoncelle
Marant
Marconne
Marconnelle
Marenla
Maresquel-Ecquemicourt
Marles-sur-Canche
Mouriez
Neulette
Nœux-lès-Auxi
Noyelles-lès-Humières
Offin
Le Parcq
Le Ponchel
Le Quesnoy-en-Artois
Quœux-Haut-Maînil
Raye-sur-Authie
Regnauville
Rollancourt
Rougefay
Roussent
Saint-Denœux
Sainte-Austreberthe
Saint-Georges
Saint-Rémy-au-Bois
Saulchoy
Sempy
Tollent
Tortefontaine
Tramecourt
Vacqueriette-Erquières
Vaulx
Vieil-Hesdin
Villers-l'Hôpital
Wail
Wambercourt
Wamin
Willeman
Willencourt

Population

See also
Cantons of Pas-de-Calais 
Communes of Pas-de-Calais 
Arrondissements of the Pas-de-Calais department

References

Auxi-le-Chateau